Pastlife is the second studio album by American indie rock musician Jackson Phillips, under the name Day Wave. The album was released on June 24, 2022 through PIAS Recordings.

Four singles were released ahead of the album: "Before We Knew", "Where Do You Go", "Pastlife", and "Loner".

Critical reception 

Pastlife received mixed to positive reviews from contemporary music critics. In a positive review, Brady Brickner-Wood, writing for Pitchfork described the album as "characteristically crisp, concise guitar pop". Brickner-Wood further said of Pastlife that it "is a coming-of-age album for 30-year-olds, concerned with newfound commitments and misbegotten ambitions". Timothy Monger, writing for AllMusic, gave Pastlife a three-star rating saying that "despite a handful of pretty melodies and a yawning sense of melancholia, Pastlife is rather unassuming, passing by in an affable 30 minutes of chiming guitars, burbling synths, and hushed introspection. If anything, it is a little smaller in scope than Day Wave's earlier releases, though painted with the same palette of sounds and moods".

In a staff review for Sputnikmusic, the album was described Phillips as "happy retreading the unambitious pleasantries of mid-2010’s bedroom-drem".

Track listing

References

External links 
 

2022 albums
PIAS Recordings albums
Day Wave albums